Arctomelon is a genus of sea snails, marine gastropod mollusks in the family Volutidae.

Species
Species within the genus Arctomelon include:
 Arctomelon benthale (Dall, 1896)
 Arctomelon borealis Roger N. Clark, 2018
 † Arctomelon harasewychi Oleinik, 1996 
 † Arctomelon lautenschlageri (Volobueva, 1981)
 † Arctomelon rateginense Oleinik, 1996 
 Arctomelon ryosukei (Habe & Ito, 1965)
 Arctomelon stearnsii (Dall, 1872)
 Arctomelon tamikoae (Kosuge, 1970)
Species brought into synonymy
 Arctomelon paucicostatus [sic] : synonym of Boreotrophon paucicostatus Habe & Ito, 1965: synonym of  Boreotrophon candelabrum (Reeve, 1848)

References

 Oldroyd, I.S. 1927. The Marine Shells of the West Coast of North America. Vol. II, Part 1. Stanford University Press, Palo Alto, California. 297 pp. + 29plts
 Habe, T. & K. Ito. 1965. Shells of the world in colour, Vol. I. Northern Pacific. 176 pp., 56 pls. Holkusha, Osaka, Japan
 Abbott, R.T. 1968. Seashells of North America. Golden Press, New York City. 280 pp
 Tiba, R. & S. Kosuge. 1980, North Pacific Shells (2) Genus Arctomelon Dall. Occasional publications of the Institute of Malacology of Tokyo. 8 pp
 Matsukuma, A., Okutani, T. & T. Habe, 1991. World Shells of Rarity and Beauty, Revised and Enlarged Ed. National Science Museum, Tokyo. 206 pp.
 Higo, S., Callomon, P., & Y. Gotō. 2001, Catalogue and Bibliography of Marine ShellBearing Mollusca of Japan Type Figures. Elle Scientific Publications, Osaka-fu, Japan
 Bail, P & Poppe, G. T. 2001. A conchological iconography: a taxonomic introduction of the recent Volutidae. Hackenheim-Conchbook, 30 pp, 5 pl.
 Roger N. Clark, The genus Arctomelon Dall, 1915 in Alaskan waters, with the description of a new species; The Festivus vol. 50 (4), November 2018

Volutidae